Glatzel is a surname. Notable people with the surname include:

 John Glatzel (born 1979), American lacrosse player
 Paul Glatzel (born 2001), English footballer
 Robert Glatzel (born 1994), German footballer